Rudolph L. Veit (born August 16, 1953) is an American politician. He is a member of the Missouri House of Representatives from the 59th District, serving since 2019. He is a member of the Republican party.

Electoral History

References

Living people
1953 births
Republican Party members of the Missouri House of Representatives
21st-century American politicians